Galvin Memorial Park is a park at the edge of Charlestown, Boston, in the U.S. state of Massachusetts. The park features a statue of General Michael Joseph Galvin.

References

External links
 

Charlestown, Boston
Monuments and memorials in Boston
Parks in Boston